John Isted (fl. 1523 – will proved 1557) was an English politician.

Family
Isted was married to Anne, and they had two sons and four daughters. He also had an illegitimate son.

Career
He was a Member (MP) of the Parliament of England for Hastings in 1547, March 1553 and April 1554.

References

Year of birth missing
1557 deaths
English MPs 1547–1552
English MPs 1553 (Edward VI)
English MPs 1554